The Jennings ministry was the 23rd ministry of the Colony of New South Wales, and was led by the eleventh Premier, Sir Patrick Jennings, and the first Roman Catholic to hold the office of Colonial Premier. Jennings was first elected to the New South Wales Legislative Assembly at the 1869–70 election, and then again in 1880.

The title of Premier was widely used to refer to the Leader of Government, but was not a formal position in the government until 1920. Instead the Premier was appointed to another portfolio, usually Colonial Secretary, but on this occasion Jenning chose the portfolio of Colonial Treasurer.

There was no party system in New South Wales politics until 1887. Under the constitution, ministers in the Legislative Assembly were required to resign to recontest their seats in a by-election when appointed. Such ministerial by-elections were usually uncontested and on this occasion a poll was required for Bathurst (Francis Suttor) and Redfern (Arthur Renwick) however both were re-elected. The other ministers were re-elected unopposed.

This ministry covers the period from 26 February 1886 until 19 January 1887. Jennings took over as Premier following the February 1886 resignation of Sir John Robertson. Jennings' ministry was beset by financial difficulties, lasted only 11 months, and was succeeded by Henry Parkes.

Composition of ministry

Ministers are members of the Legislative Assembly unless otherwise noted.

See also

References

 

New South Wales ministries
1886 establishments in Australia
1887 disestablishments in Australia